The Stuttgart Rack Railway (German: Zahnradbahn Stuttgart) is an electric rack railway in Stuttgart, Germany. It is the only urban rack railway in Germany, and one of only four rack railways operating in Germany, along with the Bavarian Zugspitze Railway, the Drachenfels Railway and the Wendelstein Railway.

Overview
Affectionately called Zacke (spike) by the residents of Stuttgart, the line was opened on 23 August 1884.  It connects the urban districts of Stuttgart South (Marienplatz) and Degerloch (Albplatz). The route runs along the Alte Weinsteige, which was historically the main route to the Filder towns until the Neue Weinsteige was built in 1826.

The maximum grade on the route is 17.5% (7 in 40) (between Liststrasse and Pfaffenweg). On the branch line to the depot of the (old) rack railway yard, the maximum is 20.0% (1 in 5). Between the stops at Pfaffenweg and Wielandshöhe there is a view of Stuttgart's city centre.

The rack railway is integrated with the metropolitan railway network of the Stuttgarter Straßenbahnen AG (SSB) as Line 10. At Marienplatz it connects with Stuttgart Stadtbahn lines U1, U9 and U34 and at Degerloch it connects with lines U5, U6, U8 and U12.

The line is one of two working railway lines that are tourist attractions in Stuttgart; the other being the  Stuttgart funicular railway that leads to the forest cemetery, and operates as SSB line 20. The ordinary VVS tickets are valid.

The rack railway cars includes a trailer in uphill direction for transporting bicycles.

History 
23 August 1884: Opening of the Stuttgart - Degerloch rack railway, the first section of the Filderbahn line, as a narrow gauge steam-operated railway with a Riggenbach system. The Filderbahn Company operated the route from Stuttgart to Degerloch station.
1902: Electrification of the rack railway and the adhesion routes from Degerloch to Hohenheim and from Möhringen to Vaihingen. Electrification of the rack railway line was delayed by two years due to technical problems.
1903: Relocation of the passing track from Haigst to Wielandshöhe.
1904: Electrical operation begins on the rack railway, steam operation limited to Sunday excursions.
1918: Two additional steam engines taken over second-hand from the Swiss Brünigbahn railway for steam services which had increased due to the war.
1920: Filderbahn taken over by the city of Stuttgart and its management transferred to the Stuttgarter Straßenbahnen (Stuttgart Tramways).
1921: Steam operations ended.
1926: All passenger coaches on the rack railway and Filderbahn repainted to SSB livery. However, to distinguish SSB-owned vehicles from Filderbahn-owned vehicles, the latter provisionally prefixed their vehicle numbers with the letter "F".
1934: Filderbahn and the rack railway transfer to the ownership of the Stuttgarter Straßenbahnen.
1935: First two railcars with 3 axles are delivered, number 101 (in service until 1982) and 102 (scrapped due to damage in 1974).
1936: Relocation of the rack railway's Stuttgart terminal station from the valley to Marienplatz to improve transfers to the trams. 
1937: Motor coach 103 was the first vehicle built entirely of steel to be delivered to the SSB. 
1950: Last two coaches of the second generation railcars delivered, number 104 (today a museum railcar) and 105 (dismantled in 1995).
1954: Last railcar of the first generation, number 109, is taken out of service.
1956: Transfer of trailer(s) from the Filderbahn to the rack railway to handle the increased school traffic. This was however extremely rarely done and then only up to 1965 when the practice was discontinued. 
1965: Replacement of the old cast iron bridge (commonly called the Turkish bridge because its manufacturer, Maschinenfabrik Esslingen, originally intended to deliver the bridge to Turkey.) over the Neue Weinsteige by the present-day reinforced concrete bridge. 
1971: As a result of changes to the track layout at Marienplatz and the construction of the underground station the double-tracked valley station at Marienplatz was replaced by a single-tracked station, half of which is located on the bridge across a water reservoir (later filled in). 
1974: Railcar number 102, recently taken out of service, is paraded in the Stuttgart Shrove Tuesday procession as an attraction.
1977: As a result of the rebuilding of the rack railway's Degerloch station, the connecting track to the adhesion railway was lifted and the rack railway became isolated from the rest of the SSB network. 
1978: Cessation of routine three-coach working.
1980: Refurbishing of the complete rack railway track for use with newly commissioned railcars of type ZT 4.
1982: Introduction of modern ZT 4 motor coaches into the metropolitan railway network. Trials on transporting  bicycles on the inclined line in a demonstration wagon designed by the company. 
1984: Centenary celebrations and last school run on the traditional rack railway route by motor coach 104 and demonstration car 120. 
1989: Replacement of the former swinging leaf doors on the ZT4 by appropriate external swing out doors on the DT8. 
1992: Sale of display car 117 (built 1896) to the Härtsfeld Museum Railway (HMB) in Neresheim. Hitherto it had been displayed by a private collector as a monument. The museum employs it today as narrow gauge passenger vehicle on its own line. 
1994: Extension of the route at the top of the line to the Albplatz to improve the connection to the metropolitan railway. 
2002: Reopening of the rebuilt terminal and bridge at the entirely redesigned and modernized Marienplatz (6 December). 
2004: Replacement of the track superstructure; partial laying of a new, slightly narrower rack rail.
2022: The fourth generation of railcars ZT 4.2 made by Stadler Rail is introduced to replace the ZT 4 after more than 40 years of service.

See also

 Passenger railways

External links 

 Stuttgart Rack Railway at trampicturebook.de

Rack railways in Germany
Transport in Stuttgart
Metre gauge railways in Germany
Railway lines in Baden-Württemberg
Railway lines opened in 1884